Cieron Macaully Keane (born 14 August 1996) is an Irish professional footballer who plays as a defender for Gainsborough Trinity.

Club career
Keane spent time at the Wolverhampton Wanderers youth team and signed his first scholarship in July 2012. However, after two years, Keane was released by the club in February 2014.

Following his release, Keane joined League One side Notts County in July 2014. He made his debut at Meadow Lane on 19 August 2014, and was sent off for two bookable offenses 71 minutes into a 2–1 victory over Colchester United. Keane made his return in his second appearance, in a 2–1 loss against Bristol City on 31 August 2014. At the end of the 2014–15 season, Keane was among ten players to be released by the club,  following their relegation to League Two.

During August 2015, Keane was signed by National League North side Nuneaton Town along with his brother Jordan Keane. On 18 August 2015, he made his debut, coming on for Marlon Harewood in the 77th minute in a 0–1 win over Lowestoft Town Keane signed for Boston United Saturday 25 August.

On 25 September 2018, Keane signed for Basford United in the Northern Premier League on a dual registration from Boston United. After spells with Leamington and Bradford Park Avenue, Keane returned to Basford again in November 2019.
On 25 May 2021, Keane joined Gainsborough Trinity.

International career
Keane was called up by Republic of Ireland U19 in September 2014. Keane made his Republic of Ireland U19 debut against Netherlands U19.

Personal life
His brothers, Kallum and Jordan, both spent brief periods with professional clubs before embarking on careers in non-league football. Other siblings include Malachi and Lucy Keane.

Career statistics

References

External links
 
 

Living people
1996 births
Footballers from Nottingham
Republic of Ireland association footballers
Republic of Ireland youth international footballers
Association football defenders
English Football League players
National League (English football) players
Northern Premier League players
Nuneaton Borough F.C. players
Kidderminster Harriers F.C. players
Worcester City F.C. players
Notts County F.C. players
Basford United F.C. players
Alfreton Town F.C. players
Boston United F.C. players
Leamington F.C. players
Bradford (Park Avenue) A.F.C. players
Stafford Rangers F.C. players
Gainsborough Trinity F.C. players